José Fernando Sardina Santiago (born 16 September 1970 in Brañosera, Palencia) is a B2 goalball athlete from Spain. He played goalball at the 1996 Summer Paralympics. His team was third.

References

External links 
 
 

1970 births
Living people
Paralympic goalball players of Spain
Paralympic bronze medalists for Spain
Paralympic medalists in goalball
Goalball players at the 1996 Summer Paralympics
Medalists at the 1996 Summer Paralympics
People from Palencia
Sportspeople from the Province of Palencia